Gabriel Katzka (1931–1990) was an American theater, film and television producer.

Biography

Early life
He was born in Brooklyn, New York City on January 25, 1931. His father, Emil Katzka, was a lawyer who had a stake in some Broadway productions. He had a sister, Benji K. Green. He attended Columbia Grammar & Preparatory School. He graduated from Kenyon College in Gambier, Ohio.

Career
He produced many films and plays. He was noted for his uncanny ability to raise financial capital for theatrical and cinematic productions.

Personal life
He was married Carol Ward Dudley Katzka, and they had a son, Edward Dudley Katzka. They lived on the Upper East Side in Manhattan. He died on February 19, 1990, in New York. A memorial service was performed at the Frank E. Campbell Funeral Chapel in Manhattan and at the Beverly Wilshire Hotel in Beverly Hills, California. He was buried in the Kensico Cemetery in Valhalla, New York.

Work
He was producer for all films unless otherwise noted.

Film

Miscellaneous crew

Television

As a theater producer
Hamlet
Comedians directed by Filipa
Barefoot in the Park
Things That Go Bump in the Night
Hughie
Beyond the Fringe

References

1931 births
1990 deaths
People from Brooklyn
People from the Upper East Side
Kenyon College alumni
Film producers from New York (state)
Burials at Kensico Cemetery
20th-century American businesspeople
Columbia Grammar & Preparatory School alumni